Per Anders Fogelström (22 August 1917, Stockholm – 20 June 1998 Stockholm) was a Swedish writer, and one of the leading figures in modern Swedish literature. He spent his whole life in Stockholm, and the most famous of the more than 40 books he wrote in total is a series of five novels set in the Swedish capital that he dearly loved, describing the lives of successive generations of Stockholmers between 1860 and 1968:

Mina Drömmars stad (City of My Dreams), published in 1960, covers the period from 1860-1880. 
Barn av sin stad (Children of Their City), published in 1962, covers 1880-1900. 
Minns du den stad (Remember the City), published in 1964, covers 1900-1925. 
I en förvandlad stad (In a City Transformed), published in 1966, covers 1925-1945. 
Stad i världen (City in the World), published in 1968, covers 1945-1968.
All five novels have been published in an English translation by Jennifer Brown Bäverstam.

A film adaptation of City of My Dreams (Swedish: Mina drömmars stad) was released in 1976, directed by Ingvar Skogsberg, with narration from Fogelström.

The 1950 film While the City Sleeps (Swedish: Medan staden sover) was adapted by Ingmar Bergman and director Lars-Eric Kjellgren from Fogelström's novel, and Bergman's taboo-breaking 1953 film Summer with Monika (Swedish: Sommaren med Monika) is based on Fogelström's 1951 novel of the same name.

An active pacifist, Fogelström served as director of the Swedish Peace and Arbitration Society (Swedish: Svenska freds- och skiljedomsföreningen) from 1963 to 1977. He was also a member of the Swedish Vietnam Committee (Swedish: Svenska Vietnamkommittén), an organization opposing the Vietnam War, and a strong opponent of nuclear weapons.

He received an honorary doctorate from Stockholm University in 1976, and was awarded the Swedish royal medal Litteris et Artibus in 1996. After his death, a bust of Fogelström was unveiled in Stockholm City Hall.

References

External links

Swedish Peace and Arbitration Society
 

1917 births
1998 deaths
Swedish male writers
Swedish pacifists
Writers from Stockholm
Litteris et Artibus recipients